Triathlon at the 2010 Asian Games was held in Guangzhou, China from November 13 to 14, 2010. Both men and women competed on the Guangzhou Triathlon Venue.

The triathlon contains three components; a 1.5 kilometers (0.93 mi) swim, 40 kilometers (25 mi) cycle, and a 10 kilometers (6.2 mi) run.

Schedule

Medalists

Medal table

Participating nations
A total of 32 athletes from 12 nations competed in triathlon at the 2010 Asian Games:

References
Triathlon results
Results

 
2010
2010 Asian Games events
Asian Games